Sir-Tech Software, Inc. was a video game developer and publisher based in the United States and Canada.

History
In fall 1979, Sirotech Software was founded by Norman Sirotek, Robert Sirotek and Robert Woodhead. Sirotech Software published Info Tree, a database management program, Galactic Attack and a beta version of Wizardry: Dungeons of Despair which was later renamed Wizardry: Proving Grounds of the Mad Overlord and formally released in fall 1981. It was the first game in the Wizardry series.

In spring 1981, Sir-Tech Software, Inc was incorporated as a video game developer and publisher in the United States.

In 1998, Sir-Tech USA closed.  The Canadian counterpart, Sirtech Canada Limited, continued to operate until late 2003.

Sir-Tech is best known for Wizardry, the role-playing video game series.  The Jagged Alliance series, first published by Sir-Tech in 1994, became a popular franchise. The third game in the series, Jagged Alliance 2, was still available from its current publisher 15 years after its initial release.

Games

Developed and published
 Info Tree (1979) (as Sirotech)
 Galactic Attack (1980) (as Sirotech)
 Wizardry: Proving Grounds of the Mad Overlord (1981)
 Wizardry II: The Knight of Diamonds (1982)
 Wizardry III: Legacy of Llylgamyn (1983)
 Crypt of Medea (1984)
 Rescue Raiders (1984)
 Deep Space: Operation Copernicus (1986)
 Wizardry IV: The Return of Werdna (1987)
 Wizardry V: Heart of the Maelstrom (1988)
 The Usurper: The Mines of Qyntarr (1989)
 Wizardry VI: Bane of the Cosmic Forge (1990)
 Freakin' Funky Fuzzballs (1990)
 Wizardry VII: Crusaders of the Dark Savant (1992)
 Jagged Alliance: Deadly Games (1996)
 Nemesis: The Wizardry Adventure (1996)
 Wizardry Gold (1996)
 Wizardry 8 (2001)

Developed only
 Jagged Alliance 2 (1999)
 Jagged Alliance 2: Unfinished Business (2000)

Published only
 Star Maze (1982)
 The Seven Spirits of Ra (1987)
 Realms of Arkania: Blade of Destiny (1993)
 Realms of Arkania: Star Trail (1994)
 Druid: Daemons of the Mind (1995)
 Jagged Alliance (1995)
 Fable (1996)
 Armed & Delirious (1997)
 Excalibur 2555 AD (1997)
 Virus: The Game (1997)
 Realms of Arkania: Shadows over Riva (1997)

Canceled
 Wizardry: Stones of Arnhem (1994)

References

External links
 Sir-Tech at MobyGames
 A history of Sir-Tech role-playing games at Bitmob via Internet Archive

Defunct video game companies of Canada
Video game companies established in 1979
Video game companies disestablished in 2003
Defunct video game companies of the United States
Video game development companies
Video game publishers